The 2016 MBC Drama Awards, presented by Munhwa Broadcasting Corporation (MBC) took place on December 30, 2016. It was hosted by Kim Gook-jin and Uee.

Winners and nominees
Winners denoted in bold
The Grand Prize (Daesang) has been determined through viewer's votes since 2014, and not by a professional set of judges.

Presenters

Special performances

References

External links

2016 television awards
MBC Drama Awards
2016 in South Korea